Mitchell Allan Scherr is an American record producer, songwriter, and singer. He has written and produced songs for artists such as Demi Lovato, Third Eye Blind, Miley Cyrus, Carlie Hanson, Jason Derulo, Pitbull, Fifth Harmony, Kelly Clarkson, Simple Plan, Faith Hill, Selena Gomez, Bowling for Soup, Jonas Brothers, Joe Cocker, selling over 20 million units and garnering multiple hit records, including five top-five singles and a worldwide number-one single.

Allan was the lead singer and rhythm guitarist of rock band SR-71, as well as the lead guitarist, producer and backing vocalist of alternative project Satellite.

Production and songwriting
Known primarily as a recording artist, Allan's songwriting career began when a song he'd written for his band SR-71 called "1985" was recorded and released by pop-punk band Bowling for Soup in 2004. The track was a top 5 hit, becoming certified Platinum and holding the record for the most iTunes downloads in a single week at the time.

In 2007 Allan was nominated for a Latin Grammy when the Belinda song he co-penned with Kara DioGuardi, "Bella Traición," received a Song of the Year nomination. That same year, another song written with DioGuardi, entitled "Lost," was recorded by Faith Hill and released as the first single from her greatest hits project. The track would find success at AC radio, ultimately spending 21 weeks on the radio charts.

In 2015 Allan had his first World Wide #1 Pop hit co-writing Jason Derulo's "Want To Want Me."  That same year he cowrote "Heartbeat Song" for Kelly Clarkson, which was nominated for a Grammy Award.

When Allan partnered with writer-producer wunderkind Jason Evigan under the moniker "The Suspex", the duo found career-making success. Together they cowrote and produced Demi Lovato's "Heart Attack," which reached #4 on the Mainstream Top 40 and became certified double platinum. The Suspex are currently working on tracks for artists such as Demi Lovato, Selena Gomez, Kelly Clarkson, Kat Graham, Victoria Justice, Fifth Harmony, Kylie Minogue, and Sia, and on his own, Allan is collaborating with Boys Like Girls' Martin Johnson, Scott Stapp, Demi Lovato, Kelly Clarkson, Delta Goodrem, Satellite, Melissa Etheridge, Andy Grammer, Simple Plan, and Hollywood Records artists Beatrice Miller, Hilary Duff and Bridgit Mendler.

Selected discography

With SR-71
 Now You See Inside (2000)
 Tomorrow (2002)
 Here We Go Again (2004)

With Satellite
 Ring the Bells (July 2011)
 Calling Birds ( February 19, 2013)

Solo
 Clawing My Way to the Middle (TBA)

Songwriting/producing

References

External links
 SR-71 official website

American male singer-songwriters
American rock singers
People from Randallstown, Maryland
Living people
Musicians from Baltimore
University of Maryland, College Park alumni
American rock songwriters
Singer-songwriters from Maryland
21st-century American male singers
21st-century American singers
Year of birth missing (living people)